Enoch Atta Agyei (born 5 January 1999) is a Ghanaian footballer who plays as a winger for Horoya AC. Agyei started his career playing for Windy Professionals, he was one the highly rated youngsters on the local scene, winning the most promising player of the Division One League after scoring 17 goals in 29 appearances. He joined Medeama for a season, before joining Tanzanian club Azam. After three seasons he joined Horoya, where he won the league in his debut season, following it up with another league title the following season.

Club career

Windy Professionals and Medeama 
Agyei started his career with Windy Professionals then in the Ghana Division One League. He scored 17 goals in 29 league appearances during the 2015 season. He put up an impressive individual performance however Windy Professionals were unfortunately relegated to the Division Two League. He was adjudged the most promising player at the end of the season. His performances in the league attracted suitors from the Ghana Premier Leagaue, especially Medeama, the reigning FA Cup champions. He was handed a trial with the club and after impressing head coach Tom Strand, he was signed on a permanent deal in November 2015. During the 2016 Ghana Premier League season, he played 16 league matches and scored 2 goals along with winning the Ghana Super Cup after scoring the league champions Ashanti Gold.

Azam 
He later moved to Tanzanian club Azam FC in November 2016. He however had to wait for over a year to make his debut after he was denied the opportunity to play due his pending paperwork. He joined the team to form a formidable defense alongside compatriot Razak Abalora.

Horoya 
In June 2019, he joined Guinean top club Horoya AC. He signed a five-year contract with the side after spending three seasons playing in the Tanzanian Premier League. Upon his move to the club, he joined compatriot Patrick Razak. In December 2019, he was named on the CAF Confederation Cup team of the week after putting in an impressive showdown to help Horoya AC overcome Djoliba AC with a 1–0 win in the group stages. He had four successful dribbles from five attempts along with placing second best in passing accuracy with an 87% succession rate.

International career 
After putting up impressive performances at Azam, he was given his first call up to the Ghana U20 national team in 2019 during the 2019 Africa U-20 Cup of Nations qualifiers, helping Ghana to qualification ultimately for the competition 2019 Africa U-20 Cup of Nations. He was named on the team's squad for the competition. During the competition he made three appearances as his side were eliminated in the group stages.

Personal life 
In May 2019, Agyei made donated football equipment to his former club Windy Professionls (Winneba Sports College) as part of his philanthropic projects and social responsibility to motivate the youngsters and team members.

Honours

Club 
Medeama

 Ghana Super Cup: 2016
Azam

 Kagame Interclub Cup: 2018

Horoya

 Guinée Championnat National: 2019–20, 2020–21

Individual 

 Division One League Most Promising Player: 2015

References

External links 
 

Living people
1999 births
Association football forwards
Ghanaian footballers
Medeama SC players
Azam F.C. players
Horoya AC players
Ghana Premier League players
Windy Professionals FC players
Ghanaian expatriate footballers
Ghanaian expatriate sportspeople in Tanzania
Ghanaian expatriate sportspeople in Guinea
Ghana youth international footballers